Jacek M. Zurada serves as a Professor of Electrical and Computer Engineering Department at the University of Louisville, Kentucky. His M.S. and Ph.D degrees are from Politechnika Gdaṅska (Gdansk University of Technology, Poland) ranked as #1 among Polish universities of technology. He has held visiting appointments at Swiss Federal Institute of Technology, Zurich, Princeton, Northeastern, Auburn, and at overseas universities in Australia, Chile, China, France, Germany, Hong Kong, Italy, Japan, Poland, Singapore, Spain, and South Africa. He is a Life Fellow of IEEE and a Fellow of International Neural Networks Society and Doctor Honoris Causa of Czestochowa Institute of Technology, Poland.

Research achievements
Dr. Zurada research contributions cover neural networks, deep learning, data mining with emphasis on data and feature understanding, rule extraction from semantic and visual information, machine learning, decomposition methods for salient feature extraction, and lambda learning rule for neural networks. His work has advanced fundamental understanding and integration of several relevant threads in neural networks and has introduced their modern taxonomy. It has formatted training algorithms in neural networks as learning in feedback systems. His more recent work has successfully addressed the lack of transparency and explanation capability due to the inherent black-box nature of neural networks.  

He developed a novel approach of statistical tests and network sensitivity evaluations by using the perturbation method to delete redundant inputs of perceptron networks and prune their weights. This work has led to rule extraction methods from pruned networks that produce if-then rules. His other achievements were in transparency of such deep learning architectures as auto-encoders and multilayer perceptrons with soft-max outputs and non-negative weights that can produce critical explanations. 

He has published 450 journal and conference papers, authored or co-authored three books, including the pioneering neural networks text "Introduction to Artificial Neural Systems" (1992), and co-edited a number of volumes in Springer Lecture Notes in Computer Science.  His books and articles were cited over 17,000 times (Google Scholar, 2022).

Professional and editorial service
Dr. Zurada has served the engineering profession as a long-time volunteer of IEEE: as 2014 IEEE Vice-President-Technical Activities (TAB Chair), as President of IEEE Computational Intelligence Society in 2004–05 and the ADCOM member in 2009–14, 2016–21 and earlier years. He chaired the IEEE TAB Strategic Planning Committee in 2015, IEEE TAB Periodicals Review and Advisory Committee in 2012–13, and the IEEE TAB Periodicals Committee in 2010–11.  In 2011 he was Vice-Chair of PSP Board and a member of PSP Board Strategic Planning Committee in 2010–11. He was a candidate for 2019 and 2020 IEEE President. 

He was the Editor-in-Chief of IEEE Transactions on Neural Networks (1998–2003), an Associate Editor of IEEE Transactions on Circuits and Systems, Pt. I and Pt. II, Action Editor in Neural Networks (Elsevier) and served on the Editorial Board of the Proceedings of the IEEE. He is an Associate Editor of Neurocomputing (Elsevier), Schedae Informaticae, the International Journal of Applied Mathematics and Computer Science, and Editor of the Springer Natural Computing, Advances in Intelligent Systems and Computing and Studies in Computational Intelligence Book series or volumes.

Awards and honours
He has received a number of awards for distinction in research, teaching, and service including the 1993 UofL's Presidential Award for Research, Scholarship and Creative Activity, 1999 IEEE Circuits and Systems Society Golden Jubilee Medal, and the 2001 and 2014 UofL's Presidential Distinguished Service Awards for Service to the Profession. In 2013 he received the Joe Desch Innovation Award. His IEEE Distinguished Speaker contributions include IEEE Circuits and Systems Society, IEEE Computational Intelligence Society (2012–15), and IEEE SMC Society (2016–21). He also served as a Fulbright Specialist in Bulgaria  (2010) and Italy (2012). In 2020 he was inducted to the IEEE Technical Activities Board Hall of Honor.

In 2003 he was conferred the Title of Professor by the President of Poland. Since 2005 he has been an elected Foreign Member of the Polish Academy of Sciences. He also received five Honorary Professorships from foreign universities, including Sichuan University in Chengdu, China, and Obuda University in Budapest, Hungary.

List of awards 

 2022 H.C. (Honoris Causa) Doctorate, awarded by Czestochowa Institute of Technology, Czestochowa, Poland, June 27, 2022
 2022 J. Groszkowski Medal, awarded by the Association of Polish Electrical Engineers for leadership in building information-based society, Warsaw, Poland, May 2022
 2020 IEEE Technical Activities Hall of Fame Award, by the IEEE Technical Activities Board for membership globalization and educational efforts, November 2020
 2019 Certificate of Appreciation for Contributions to the 1st Societal Automation Conference from IEEE/Academy of Mining and Metallurgy, Krakow, Poland, September 2019
 2018 Certificate of Recognition, by the President of IEEE Computational Intelligence Society for service on the Society Board in 2016-18
 2018 Honorary Diploma of the Gdansk University of Technology, Gdansk, Poland by the University President for distinguished professional career of 50 years that brought recognition to the University, August 8
 2018 Certificate of Recognition, by IEEE-VP-Member and Geographical Services for dedicated service on the IEEE MGA Board in 2017
 2017 Special Springer Volume “Dedicated to Professor Jacek Zurada: Advances in Data Analysis with Computational Intelligence Methods”, vol. Studies in Computational Intelligence No. 738, Eds. A.E. Gaweda. J. Kacprzyk, L. Rutkowski, G.G. Yen
 2017 Certificate of Recognition, by IEEE-VP-Member and Geographical Services for dedicated service on the IEEE MGA Board in 2016
 2016-17 Distinguished Speaker for IEEE Systems, Man and Cybernetics Society
 2015-19 Member of the Board of Overseers, Polish Academy of Science
 2015 INNS Fellow Award, by International Neural Networks Society
 2015 Resolution of Appreciation, adopted by IEEE Technical Activities Board by acclamation
 2015 Certificate of Appreciation and Golden Gavel, for Services as IEEE Technical Activities Board Chair
 2015 Honorary Professor, conferred by the Obuda University, Budapest, Hungary
 2015 Outstanding Contribution Award, by China University of Petroleum, Qingdao, China
 2014 Plaque of Recognition, by IEEE Technical Activities Board for service as Board’s Chair
 2014 Distinguished Service Award for Service to the Profession, by the President of the University of Louisville
 2014 Certificate of Recognition, by the President of IEEE Computational Intelligence Society for service on the Society Board in 2012-14
 2014 Outstanding Polish American, Science Category, by Pangea Network, Chicago, May 3, 2014
 2014 IEEE Life Fellow Award
 2013 Joe Desch Innovation Award in Recognition of Exceptional Insights and Achievements which Advanced the Horizons of Digital Technologies, by the Engineers Club of Dayton, Ohio
 2013 Certificate of Appreciation, for Services as IEEE Technical Activities Board Member
 2013-15 Distinguished Speaker for IEEE Computational Intelligence Society
 2012 Certificate of Successful Completion of the Fulbright Specialist Program, from the Assistant Secretary of State for Educational and Cultural Affairs, US State Department
 2012 Fulbright Specialist Award for project with University of Catania, Italy, May 8-June 6, 2012
 2012 Honorary Professor Award, by China University of Petroleum, Qingdao, China, April 6, 2012
 2011 IES Prestigious Engineering Achievement Award “In recognition of an outstanding engineering project which has made significant contributions to Singapore’s development”, November 2011
 2010-14 Member of the Board of Overseers, Polish Academy of Science
 2010, 11 Certificates of Appreciation, for Services as IEEE Technical Activities Board Member
 2010, 11 Certificates of Appreciation, for Services IEEE Publication Services and Products Board member
 2010 Awarded the Title of an Honorary Professor, by the Sechuan University, Chengdu, China
 2010-12 University Scholar, University of Louisville
 2009 Fulbright Specialist Award for project with Technical University-Varna, Bulgaria, June 28-July 24, 2009
 2008 IEEE Computational Intelligence Society Meritorious Service Award
 2008 Award for Exceptional Contributions to the Advancement of the Neural Networks Community in Poland, awarded by the Polish Neural Networks Society
 2007 Certificate of Appreciation, by the President of IEEE Computational Intelligence Society for service as IEEE CIS Past President in 2006 and for service on the Society’s Board
 2007-09 Distinguished University Professor, University of Louisville
 2006 Awarded the Status of Fulbright Specialist for 2006-12
 2006 Awarded the Title of Honorary Professor, by the Chinese University of Electronic Science and Technology, Chengdu, China
 2005 Elected to the Distinction of a Foreign Member of the Polish Academy of Sciences
 2005 Certificate of Recognition as 2005 IEEE Technical Activities Board Member, by the President of IEEE
 2004 Certificate of Recognition as 2004 IEEE Technical Activities Board Member, by the President of IEEE
 2003 Awarded the Title of an Honorary Professor, by Hebei University, China
 2003 Awarded the Title of a National Professor, by Mr. Aleksander Kwasniewski, President of Poland
 2003 Certificate of Appreciation, by the IASTED International Conference on Neural Networks and Computational Intelligence, Cancun, Mexico
 2001 Distinguished Service Award for Service to the Profession, by the President of the University of Louisville
 2000 3rd Faculty Prize in the Innovation in Biotechnology for the Poster Paper at the Research!Louisville Conference (shared with three co-authors)
 2000 Certificate of Nomination in Recognition of Distinguished Service, awarded by the President of the University of Louisville
 1999 IEEE Circuits and Systems Society Golden Jubilee Medal
 1999 Best Poster Paper Session Award, International Joint Conference on Neural Networks (two awards for one paper co-authored each), Washington, DC, July 10-16, 1999
 1998-11 Distinguished Speaker for IEEE Computational Intelligence Society
 1998 Certificate of Appreciation for Outstanding Performance in Support of the 1998 IEEE World Congress on Computational Intelligence, Anchorage, Alaska, by IEEE Neural Networks Council
 1997 Certificate of Appreciation for Services Rendered as 1992-97 Associate Editor of the IEEE Transactions on Neural Networks, awarded by IEEE Neural Networks Council
 1997 Certificate of Appreciation for Services Rendered as 1995-97 Associate Editor of the IEEE Transactions on Circuits and Systems, Part II: Analog and Digital Signal Processing, awarded by IEEE Circuits and Systems Society
 1997 Polish Ministry of National Education Award
 1996 IEEE Fellow Award, awarded by IEEE Board of Directors
 1996 Distinguished Service Plaque as Plenary/Special Session Committee, and Awards Committee Chair, 1996 IEEE International Conference on Neural Networks, Washington, DC
 1997 Certificate of Appreciation for Services Rendered as 1993-95 Associate Editor of the IEEE Transactions on Circuits and Systems, Part II: Analog and Digital Signal Processing, awarded by IEEE Circuits and Systems Society
 1994-02 Distinguished Speaker for IEEE Circuits and Systems Society
 1994 Certificate of Appreciation for Outstanding Performance in Support of the 1994 IEEE World Congress on Computational Intelligence, Orlando, Florida, by IEEE Neural Networks Council
 1994 Louisville IEEE Section Engineering Achievement Award
 1994 Japanese Society for Promotion of Science Fellowship (2 months)
 1993 Research, Scholarship and Creative Activity Presidential Award, by the President of the University of Louisville
 1986 Louisville IEEE Section Outstanding Electrical Engineer Award of the Year
 1985 Nominee of the Electrical Engineering Department for the University of Louisville Research Award
 1980 Polish Ministry of Science, Higher Education and Technology Research Team Award, First Class for the book Active RC Filters (co-authored with M. Bialko, W. Sienko, A. Guzinski)
 1979 Yearly Distinction for Excellence in Teaching awarded by the Electronics Department Head, Technical University of Gdansk, Gdansk, Poland
 1976 Polish Ministry of Science, Higher Education and Technology Research Award (Third Class) for advances in the state-of-the-art in active electronic filters
 1975 Ph.D. degree with Distinction
 1971-77 Yearly Research Awards by the President of the Technical University of Gdansk, Gdansk, Poland

References

External links
Home page of Dr. Jacek M. Zurada. Accessed June 14, 2008.

1944 births
Artificial intelligence researchers
Electrical engineering academics
Living people
Machine learning researchers
Polish academics
University of Louisville faculty
Polish computer scientists
Gdańsk University of Technology alumni